In mathematics, specifically in representation theory, a Borel subalgebra of a Lie algebra  is a maximal solvable subalgebra. The notion is named after Armand Borel.

If the Lie algebra  is the Lie algebra of a complex Lie group, then a Borel subalgebra is the Lie algebra of a Borel subgroup.

Borel subalgebra associated to a flag 
Let  be the Lie algebra of the endomorphisms of a finite-dimensional vector space V over the complex numbers. Then to specify a Borel subalgebra of  amounts to specify a flag of V; given a flag , the subspace  is a Borel subalgebra, and conversely, each Borel subalgebra is of that form by Lie's theorem. Hence, the Borel subalgebras are classified by the flag variety of V.

Borel subalgebra relative to a base of a root system 
Let  be a complex semisimple Lie algebra,  a Cartan subalgebra and R the root system associated to them. Choosing a base of R gives the notion of positive roots. Then  has the decomposition  where . Then  is the Borel subalgebra relative to the above setup. (It is solvable since the derived algebra  is nilpotent. It is maximal solvable by a theorem of Borel–Morozov on the conjugacy of solvable subalgebras.)

See also 
Borel subgroup
Parabolic Lie algebra

References 

. 
.
.

Representation theory
Lie algebras